Egerika Range (‘Hrebet Egerika’ \'hre-bet e-ge-'ri-ka\ is the mostly ice-covered range extending 16.2 km in south-north direction and 7 km wide, rising to 1314 m (Mount Morton) in the north foothills of Herbert Plateau on Danco Coast in Graham Land, Antarctica.  It is connected to Obretenik Bastion to the south by Kormyansko Saddle, and surmounts Blériot Glacier to the west, Hughes Bay to the northwest and Cayley Glacier to the east.

The range is named after the Thracian settlement of Egerika in Western Bulgaria.

Location
British mapping in 1978.

Maps
British Antarctic Territory. Scale 1:200000 topographic map. DOS 610 Series, Sheet W 64 60. Directorate of Overseas Surveys, Tolworth, UK, 1978.
 Antarctic Digital Database (ADD). Scale 1:250000 topographic map of Antarctica. Scientific Committee on Antarctic Research (SCAR). Since 1993, regularly upgraded and updated.

Notes

References
 Bulgarian Antarctic Gazetteer. Antarctic Place-names Commission. (details in Bulgarian, basic data in English)
 Egerika Range. SCAR Composite Gazetteer of Antarctica.

External links
Egerika Range. Copernix satellite image

Mountain ranges of Graham Land
Bulgaria and the Antarctic
Danco Coast